Émile Calixte Rochard (3 July 1851, Wissembourg – May 1918, Paris) was a 19th–20th-century French playwright, novelist and poet.

Biography 
He made his debut in literature in 1870 with a comedy, Un Amour de Diane de Poitiers and volunteered during the Franco-Prussian war of 1870.

A drama critic at Gil-Blas, codirector of Théâtre du Châtelet (1880–1883) with Félix Duquesnel, director of Théâtre de l'Ambigu-Comique (1884–1903) then of Théâtre de la Porte-Saint-Martin (1991–1903), his plays were presented on the most important Parisian stages of the 19th century.

Rochard was made a chevalier of the Légion d'honneur 9 July 1892.

Works 
1870: Un Amour de Diane de Poitiers, one-act comedy, in verse
1873: La Conscience, one-act episode, in verse
1874: Les Petits ours, futilités parisiennes, poetry
1875: La Botte secrète, one-act play, with Georges Guilhaud
1875: Plus de journaux, one-act comedy
1879: Le Loup de Kevergan, drama in five acts and tableaux, with Eugène Hubert and Christian de Trogoff
1903: Les Dernières cartouches, drama in 5 acts and 10 tableaux, with Mary
1903: Les deux Eves, novel, 2 vols., Flammarion ed.
1906: Roule-ta-bosse, drama in 5 acts, 6 tableaux, preceded by a prologue
1906: Sonnez, clairons ! roman contemporain (1865–1898), Flammarion ed.
1908: La Bête féroce, drama in 5 acts, 8 tableaux, with Mary
1908: La Beauté du diable, drama in 5 acts and 8 tableaux, including a prologue, with Mary
1909: Les Deux jeunesses, poems, Lemerre
1910: Le Péché de Marthe, drama in 2 parts, 5 acts and 7 tableaux, after the novel by Paul Bertnay
1911: L'Enfant des fortifs, play in 5 acts and 8 tableaux, with Mary
1911: Toute la femme en cent rondels : cœur, corps, atours, frivolités, poems
1912: L'Avocat des gueux, drama in 5 acts and 7 tableaux, derivec from the novel published in Petit Parisien, with Jules Mary
1913: Jésus selon les Évangiles, novel, Lemerre
1913: La Passion, drama in 5 acts and 8 tableaux derived from Jésus selon les Évangiles
1917: Le Berceau de Jésus, drama in 2 parts and 6 tableaux
1919: Jésus, (vie publique), drama in 5 acts and 10 tableaux
1919: La Résurrection, two-part drama

Bibliography 
 Études religieuses, historiques et littéraires, 1919, (p. 43)
 Henry Philips, Aude Pichon, Louis-Georges Tin, Le théâtre catholique en France au XXe siècle, 2007, (p. 292)

External links 

19th-century French dramatists and playwrights
20th-century French dramatists and playwrights
19th-century French novelists
20th-century French novelists
19th-century French poets
20th-century French poets
French theatre managers and producers
Chevaliers of the Légion d'honneur
1851 births
People from Wissembourg
1918 deaths